Al-Hamraa Subdistrict  is a Syrian nahiyah (subdistrict) located in Hama District in Hama.  According to the Syria Central Bureau of Statistics (CBS), Al-Hamraa Subdistrict had a population of 32604 in the 2004 census.

References 

Hamraa
Hama District